Cingulopsidae is a family of sea snails, marine gastropod molluscs in the clade Littorinimorpha.

According to taxonomy of the Gastropoda by Bouchet & Rocroi (2005) the family Cingulopsidae has no subfamilies.

Genera and species 
Genera and species within the Cingulopsidae include:
 † Dieretostoma Cossmann, 1888 
 Eatonina Thiele, 1912
 Pickenia Ponder, 1983
 Pseudopisinna Ponder & Yoo, 1980
 Skenella Pfeffer, 1886
 Tubbreva Ponder, 1965
 Tubbreva exaltata
 Tubbreva micrometrica Aradas & Benoit, 1876
Genera brought into synonymy
 Cingulopsis Fretter & Patil, 1958: synonym of Eatonina Thiele, 1912
 Coriandria Tomlin, 1917: synonym of Eatonina Thiele, 1912
 Eatoniopsis Ponder, 1965: synonym of Skenella Pfeffer, 1886
 Microsetia Monterosato, 1884: synonym of Eatonina Thiele, 1912

References 

 Fretter V. & Patil A.M. 1958. A revision of the systematic position of the prosobranch gastropod Cingulopsis (= Cingula) fulgida (J. Adams). Proceedings of the Malacological Society of London 33: 114–126.
 Ponder W.F. (1965). A revision of the New Zealand recent species previously known as Notosetia Iredale, 1915 (Rissoidae, Gastropoda). Records of the Auckland Institute and Museum. 6(2): 101-131
 Ponder W.F. (1989). Mediterranean Cingulopsidae, a relict eastern Tethyan fauna (Gastropoda, Cingulopsidae). . Bollettino Malacologico 25 (1-4): 85-90

External links
 Ponder, W.F.; Yoo, E.K. (1981 [1980). A review of the genera of Cingulopsidae with a revision of the Australian and tropical Indo-Pacific species (Mollusca: Gastropoda: Prosobranchia). Records of the Australian Museum. 33: 1-88
 Bouchet, P., Rocroi, J.-P. (2005). Classification and nomenclator of gastropod families. Malacologia. 47(1-2): 1-397.